Infrared vision is the capability of biological or artificial systems to detect infrared radiation. The terms thermal vision and thermal imaging, are also commonly used in this context since infrared emissions from a body are directly related to their temperature: hotter objects emit more energy in the infrared spectrum than colder ones.

The human body, as well as many moving or static objects of military or civil interest, are normally warmer than the surrounding environment. Since hotter objects emit more infrared energy than colder ones, it is relatively easy to identify them with an infrared detector, day or night. Hence, the term night vision is also used (sometimes misused) in the place of "infrared vision", since one of the original purposes in developing this kind of systems was to locate enemy targets at night. However, night vision concerns the ability to see in the dark although not necessarily in the infrared spectrum. In fact, night vision equipment can be manufactured using one of two technologies: light intensifiers or infrared vision. The former technology uses a photocathode to convert light (in the visible or near infrared portions of the electromagnetic spectrum) to electrons, amplify the signal and transform it back to photons. Infrared vision on the other hand, uses an infrared detector working at mid or long wavelengths (invisible to the human eye) to capture the heat emitted by an object.

The infrared spectrum

The entire electromagnetic spectrum highlighting the infrared part located between the visible and the radio waves, is depicted in the figure. The IR spectrum can be subdivided into 5 regions, although this definition is somewhat arbitrary and it differs from one author to another. The subdivision presented here is based on a combination of the atmospheric transmittance windows, i.e. the wavelengths regions in which infrared radiation is better transmitted through the atmosphere, the detector materials used to build the infrared sensors and the main applications. In this way, the Near Infrared (NIR) band is mostly used in fiber optic telecommunication systems since silica (SiO2) provides a low attenuation losses medium for the infrared, whilst the Short Wave Infrared (SWIR) band allows to work on long-distance telecommunications (remote sensing) using a combination of detector materials. The Medium Wavelength Infrared (MWIR) and the Long Wavelength Infrared (LWIR) bands find applications in Infrared Thermography for military or civil applications, e.g. target signature identification, surveillance, NonDestructive Evaluation, etc. The Very Long Wavelength Infrared (VLWIR) band is used in spectroscopy and astronomy.

The MWIR band is preferred when inspecting high temperature objects and the LWIR band when working with near room temperature objects. Other important criteria for band selection are: the operating distance, indoor-outdoor operation, temperature and emissivity of the bodies of interest. For instance, long wavelengths (LWIR) are preferred for outdoor operation since they are less affected by radiation from the Sun. LWIR cameras are typically uncooled systems using Focal Plane Array microbolometers commonly used in industrial IR applications, although cooled LWIR cameras using Mercury Cadmium Tellurium (MCT) detectors exists as well. On the contrary, the majority of the MWIR cameras require cooling, using either liquid nitrogen or a Stirling cycle cooler. Cooling to approximately −196 °C (77 K) offers excellent thermal resolution, but might restrict the span of applications to controlled environments.

Applications

Infrared vision is used extensively by the military for night vision, navigation, surveillance and targeting. For years, it developed slowly due to the high cost of the equipment and the low quality of available images. Since the development of the first commercial infrared cameras in the second half of the 1960s, however, the availability of new generations of infrared cameras coupled with growing computer power is providing exciting new civilian (and military) applications, to name only a few: buildings and infrastructure, works of art, aerospace components and processes, maintenance, defect detection and characterization, law enforcement, surveillance and public services, medical and veterinary thermal imaging. The electronic technique that uses infrared vision to "see" thermal energy, to monitor temperatures and thermal patterns is called infrared thermography.

On February 14, 2013 researchers developed a neural implant that gives rats the ability to sense infrared light which for the first time provides living creatures with new abilities, instead of simply replacing or augmenting existing abilities.

See also
 Infrared window
 Thermographic inspection
 Thermoception
 Infrared sensing in snakes
 Infrared sensing in vampire bats
Optical materials used for infrared optics

References

External links
 What is IR ?
 Canada Research Chair in Multipolar Infrared Vision - MiViM

Electromagnetic spectrum
Surveillance